Melogramma is a genus of fungi within the family Melanconidaceae. The genus was described by Elias Magnus Fries in 1849.

References

Melanconidaceae